Full Force is an American music group of hip hop and R&B singers and producers from Brooklyn, New York.

Members
B-Fine (Brian George) - drums and drum programming, backing vocals 
Shy Shy (Hugh Junior Clark) - bass guitar,  backing vocals 
Paul Anthony (Paul Anthony George) - vocals
Bow-Legged Lou (Lucien George Jr.) - vocals
Curt-T-T (Curt Bedeau) - guitar, backing vocals 
Baby Gee (Gerry Charles) - keyboards, synthesizers, backing vocals.

History

Production and songwriting
The group produced and wrote music for numerous artists including UTFO, Doctor Ice, Samantha Fox, Patti LaBelle, The Force M.D.s, Britney Spears, James Brown, Lisa Lisa and Cult Jam, Backstreet Boys, 'N Sync, Cheryl Pepsii Riley, Selena and Lil' Kim.

Full Force's breakthrough hit was UTFO's "Roxanne, Roxanne" (1984), a record that led to several answer records, most notably one by Roxanne Shanté. Through the 80s the group produced a string of major hits for Lisa Lisa and Cult Jam, including "I Wonder If I Take You Home", "All Cried Out" and "Head to Toe". They also scored hits for Samantha Fox, including "Naughty Girls (Need Love Too)" and "I Wanna Have Some Fun" and R&B singer Cheryl Pepsii Riley including US R&B number one "Thanks for My Child". Their 1988 single "I'm Real" for James Brown gave the legendary singer his biggest hit for 14 years, peaking at US R&B number two.

Additionally, the group wrote and produced most of the singles from La Toya Jackson's fifth studio album La Toya, including "You're Gonna Get Rocked!" and "You Blew," as well as Patti LaBelle's track "I Got It Like That", for which they also provided prominent background vocals from her 1989 album Be Yourself. Full Force also provided backing vocals on two Bob Dylan songs recorded during sessions for Infidels: "Death Is Not the End" (released on Down in the Groove (1988) and "Tell Me" (released on The Bootleg Series Volumes 1-3 (Rare & Unreleased) 1961-1991).

Full Force's biggest hit from the 1990s was the Backstreet Boys' 1998 US top 5/UK number 2 hit single "All I Have to Give". Full Force also worked with Prince's ex-wife Mayté on her 1995 album Child of the Sun, however the tracks remain unreleased.

Full Force also contributed to the production on Blaque's 2002 unreleased album, Blaque Out and Lil' Kim's 2003 release, La Bella Mafia, on her song "Can't Fuck with Queen Bee." The group produced Rihanna's "That La, La, La," which appears on her 2005 debut album Music of the Sun. The Black Eyed Peas' 2005 worldwide hit "Don't Phunk with My Heart" was also written as a collaboration between Full Force and will.i.am of the Peas.

Recording
In addition to their production résumé, the group have also released their own albums and music. Their 1985 single "Alice, I Want You Just for Me!" became a Top 10 hit in the UK in January 1986. They placed several hit singles under their own name on the US Billboard R&B chart during the latter half of the 1980s. Tracks such as "Unselfish Lover" (from their self-titled debut) and "Temporary Love Thing" (from their follow-up album, Full Force Get Busy 1 Time!) received substantial airplay. "All in My Mind" became the group's first and only single to date to reach the R&B Top Ten in 1988.

In 2001 Thump Records, a label known for its freestyle compilations, released the group's first greatest hits compilation Ahead of Their Time! Full Force's Greatest Hits. In 2007, on its Columbia release Legendary, the group has a song dedicated to Oprah Winfrey titled "We're Feeling You, Oprah."  It was inspired by the related members' mother's love for Winfrey.

Acting
They appeared in the 1990 comedy film House Party and its first sequel as the bullies of Kid 'n Play. (Although not included on House Party'''s official soundtrack album, Full Force's "Ain't My Type of Hype" was used in the film's dance-battle scene.) Bowlegged Lou also acted in Who's the Man? (1993) and played Lord Primus in the 2013 sci-fi TV series Body Jumpers.

Discography
Albums

Singles

As Producers

Filmography
 1985: Krush Groove 1990: House Party 1991: House Party 2 1993: Who's the Man''

References

External links
Official Fullforce Site
Official Fansite
Full Force Discography at Discogs.

African-American record producers
American hip hop record producers
American contemporary R&B musical groups
Capitol Records artists
Columbia Records artists
New jack swing music groups
Record production teams
Songwriters from New York (state)
TVT Records artists
Musical groups from Brooklyn
1976 establishments in New York City